

The Gastambide-Mengin monoplane (later Gastambide-Mengin I, Gastambide-Mengin II and Antoinette II) was an early French experimental aircraft designed by Léon Levavasseur, and was the first aircraft built by the Antoinette company. The name came from Jules Gastambide, who financed the company, and Gabriel Mengin, the aircraft engineer.

Design and development
The monoplane (later known as the Gastambide-Mengin I) was powered by a  Antoinette piston engine driving a tractor propeller. It was noted for having a complex quadricycle landing gear. The monoplane made four flights between 8 and 14 February 1908 flown by a mechanic named Boyer, the furthest being a flight of 150 m. After these flights, the aircraft was rebuilt between February and August 1908 as the Gastambide-Mengin II (later named the Antoinette II), the modifications including revised, trailing edge-hinged triangular ailerons. The modified aircraft made three short flights in August 1908, one of these on 21 August 1908 being the first circle flown by a monoplane, and on a flight the previous day (20 August 1908) Robert Gastambide became the first passenger flown in a monoplane. With lessons learnt from the design, Levavasseur went on to design a family of monoplanes named after Antoinette Gastambide, the daughter of Jules Gastambide.

Specifications

See also 

 Antoinette III
 Antoinette IV
 Antoinette V
 Antoinette VI
 Antoinette VII
 Antoinette military monoplane
 Fedor Ivanovich Bylinkin, designer of a similar aircraft, 1910

References
Notes

Bibliography

www.aviafrance.com

1900s French experimental aircraft
Antoinette aircraft
Single-engined tractor aircraft
Shoulder-wing aircraft
Aircraft first flown in 1908